Stephen Dunn (born January 18, 1989) is a Canadian director, screenwriter, and producer. He made his feature film directorial debut in 2015 with Closet Monster, which premiered at the Toronto International Film Festival.

Early life
Dunn was born and raised in St. John's, Newfoundland and Labrador. He later studied at the Canadian Film Centre and at Ryerson University.

Career
Dunn attended film school at Ryerson University in Toronto and produced several short films as a student, many of which screened at festivals. One of his early short films, titled Life Doesn't Frighten Me, starred Canadian actor Gordon Pinsent and won various awards, including the CBC Short Film Face-Off, with a cash prize of $30,000. The film also won awards at the Toronto Student Film Festival and the Tribeca Film Festival in 2013.

His other short films have included Lionel Lonely Heart, Words! Words! Words! and Swallowed.

Closet Monster 
Dunn's feature film directorial debut, Closet Monster, won the award for Best Canadian Feature Film at the 2015 Toronto International Film Festival. He was also named the inaugural winner of the Len Blum Residency, a Toronto International Film Festival program for emerging directors.

Other work 
Dunn directed and produced the web series Pop-Up Porno, which streams on YouTube and premiered at the Sundance Film Festival. He also directed "The Son", a 2020 episode of the Apple TV+ series Little America focusing on a gay immigrant from Syria, and has been writing a planned reboot of Queer as Folk.

Personal life
In 2022, Dunn told the public that the new location for Queer as Folk (2022 TV series) is set in New Orleans because he wanted to give a contribute to his close drag queen superstar friend Chi Chi DeVayne, who is deceased. Dunn is also an openly gay man.

Filmography

Film

Television 
The numbers in directing and writing credits refer to the number of episodes.

References

External links

Film directors from Newfoundland and Labrador
Canadian male screenwriters
LGBT film directors
Canadian LGBT screenwriters
Canadian gay writers
Writers from St. John's, Newfoundland and Labrador
Living people
1989 births
Canadian Film Centre alumni
Toronto Metropolitan University alumni
21st-century Canadian screenwriters
Canadian television directors
LGBT television directors
Gay screenwriters
Film producers from Newfoundland and Labrador
Canadian television producers
21st-century Canadian LGBT people